Monochamus millegranus is a species of beetle in the family Cerambycidae. It was described by Henry Walter Bates in 1891. It is known from China. It feeds on Castanea mollissima.

References

millegranus
Beetles described in 1891